The Gagasan Rakyat (GR or People's Might) was an opposition Malaysian political coalition. The now defunct political coalition was founded by Tengku Razaleigh Hamzah's formation of Parti Melayu Semangat 46 (S46 or Semangat 46) after leaving United Malays National Organisation (UMNO) that was declared illegal. The coalition consisted Semangat 46, Democratic Action Party (DAP), United Sabah Party (PBS), Malaysian People's Party (PRM), Indian Progressive Front (IPF) and Malaysian Solidarity Party (MSP) as the coalition components. It were also joined by three other component members from its allied opposition Angkatan Perpaduan Ummah (APU) coalition also led by Razaleigh consisting of himself Razaleigh's Spirit of 46 Malay Party (S46), Pan-Malaysian Islamic Party (PAS), Pan-Malaysian Islamic Front (BERJASA), Muslim People's Party of Malaysia (HAMIM) and Malaysian Indian Muslim Congress (KIMMA). On 25 January 1995, Parti Tindakan Demokratik withdrew from the coalition.

Both the Gagasan Rakyat and Angkatan Perpaduan Ummah opposition coalitions under the leadership of Razaleigh were defeated in the 1990 and 1995 general elections, and were subsequently dissolved in 1996 after Razaleigh decided to disband Semangat 46 to rejoin the UMNO.

Not to be confused with Parti Gagasan Rakyat Sabah (also abreviated Gagasan Rakyat), a different party that was established in 2013 with 20 other parties registered under Societies Act 1966 (Malaysia).

Component parties
 Spirit of 46 Malay Party (Parti Melayu Semangat 46) 
 Democratic Action Party (Parti Tindakan Demokratik)
 Parti Bersatu Sabah (United Sabah Party)
 Malaysian People's Party (Parti Rakyat Malaysia)
 Indian Progressive Front (Barisan Progresif India)
 Malaysian Solidarity Party (Parti Solidariti Malaysia)
Three others also allied members of the Angkatan Perpaduan Ummah at the same time.
 Muslim People's Party of Malaysia (Parti Hizbul Muslimin Malaysia)
 Malaysian Indian Muslim Congress (Kongres India Muslim Malaysia)

Elected representatives
 Members of the Dewan Rakyat, 8th Malaysian Parliament
 Malaysian State Assembly Representatives (1990–95)
 Members of the Dewan Rakyat, 9th Malaysian Parliament
 Malaysian State Assembly Representatives (1995–99)

General election results

State election results

References

Defunct political party alliances in Malaysia
1990 establishments in Malaysia
Political parties established in 1990
1996 disestablishments in Malaysia
Political parties disestablished in 1996